The French football champions are the winners of the highest league of football in France, Ligue 1. Since the National Council of the French Football Federation voted in support of professionalism in French football in 1930, the professional football championship of France has been contested through Ligue 1, formerly known as Division 1 from 1933–2002. 

Prior to this, the first division championship of French football was contested through a league run by the Union des Sociétés Françaises de Sports Athlétiques (USFSA), an organization that supported amateur sport. The USFSA's league run from 1894 to 1919 and awarded 22 league titles before being suspended in 1915 due to World War I and the creation and success of the Coupe de France, which had quickly become the country's national competition. The USFSA returned in 1919 changing the league into numerous regional amateur leagues that awarded no league title. This system lasted from 1919 to 1926. In 1926, the first division's reins were handed over to the French Football Federation. The federation organized and ran a league composed of the regional amateur league champions called the Championnat de France amateur from 1927 to 1929 and awarded three titles before the league was converted to the professional league that exists today in 1932.

The first champions of French football were Standard Athletic Club, who defeated The White Rovers 2–0 in Courbevoie on 6 May 1894. The initial championship match was held on 29 April but finished 2–2, so the match was replayed. Standard went on to win the French championship four more times over the next seven years before RC Roubaix took control of the league becoming the first French club to win three straight titles beginning in 1902.. Following Roubaix's success, the ownership of the amateur league title began rotating back and forth from the north of France to the south of France with Marseille eventually winning the last amateur title in 1929.

The first French football champions of the professional era were Olympique Lillois, a predecessor of Lille, who defeated Cannes 4–3 on 14 May 1933 at the Stade Olympique Yves-du-Manoir in Colombes. Sète were crowned champions the following season and, in 1939, became the first professional club in France to win two titles. Following the conclusion of World War II, Saint-Étienne became the model club of the country winning four consecutive titles from 1966 to 1970. The club won all its 10 titles in a span of 25 years. Marseille repeated Saint-Étienne's feat of four consecutive titles from 1988 to 1992. It would take the club another 17 years to win another title. During the hiatus between Marseille's title in 1992 and the club's most recent in 2010, Lyon established themselves as a top club winning their first title in 2002. The title started a national record-breaking streak of seven successive league championships with the streak coming to an end following the 2008–09 season when Bordeaux eclipsed them winning their sixth title.

Saint-Étienne, Marseille and Paris Saint-Germain have the most titles in French football, with ten each. The majority of Saint-Étienne's titles came during the 1960s and 1970s when the club was led by managers Jean Snella, Albert Batteux, and Robert Herbin. Marseille has nine professional league titles and one amateur title which they won in the 1928–29 season. The club initially equalled Saint-Étienne's number of titles won during the 1992–93 season, but the title was stripped after it was discovered by the Ligue de Football Professionnel (LFP) that the club's president Bernard Tapie had bribed the opposition's players. Tapie was later found guilty of bribery and sentenced to two years in prison. In the 2009–10 season, Marseille equalled Saint-Étienne's number of titles, amateur or professional. Paris Saint-Germain won seven of their ten titles in a ten-year span from 2013 to 2022. Nantes and Monaco are fourth with eight titles each, while Lyon has seven.

List of champions

Amateur era (1893–1929)

Professional era (1932–present)

Performance

Performance by club in Amateur Era and Professional Era

Notes:
Bold indicates clubs currently playing in Ligue 1.
Lille OSC is the legal heir of Olympique Lillois.
Toulouse FC is not the successor to Toulouse FC (1937).

Performance by club in Professional era

Notes:
Clubs in bold are competing in 2021–22 Ligue 1.
Marseille were stripped of their title by the LFP after being found guilty of bribery in 1992–93 French Division 1. No winner was declared for that season.

Performance by club in Amateur era

Notes:

 RC Paris, Marseille and Olympique Lillois are the only teams who managed to win in Amateur era and also in Professional era.

Notes

References

External links
 History of Football in France 

Champions
France
champions